London Studio is a first-party video game developer for Sony Interactive Entertainment

London Studio may also refer to:
 The London Studios, a television studio complex
 London Studio Centre, a dance and theatre school